Hoboksar, sometimes referred with the historic name Hefeng County, is an autonomous county for Mongol people in the middle north of Xinjiang Uyghur Autonomous Region, Western China, it is under the administration of Tacheng Prefecture. It has eight towns and townships and seven farms, Hoboksar Town is its county seat.

Name
The name of Hoboksar was individually referred to as "Hobok" and "Sar" from the Mongolian language. Hobok is Hobok River, it means "sika deer", the river was named after its river basin within huge amount of sika deer in the past. Sar is the Salair Mountains and it means horseback, the mountain was named after its shape like a horseback.

History
At the latest starting from the Qin dynasty, the Saka people appeared in the place of present Hoboksar area. This was followed by the Usans and Xiongnu people.

The place was part of Usan Sate in the Western Han period. It was merged to the Later Cheshi Kingdom in the Eastern Han and Three Kingdoms periods. It was part of Xianbei during the Jin period, part of Rouran Khaganate, followed by the First Turkic Khaganate, Western Turkic Khaganate in the period of Northern and Southern dynasties. It was under the administration of Kunling Commandery of the Tang dynasty in 657, ruled by Karluks in 789, Uyghur Khaganate in 808, Kyrgyz Khaganate in 840 and Qara Khitai in 1127, it was merged to the Yuan dynasty in 1218, became the dominion of Ögedei Khan in 1225, then after that, the territory of Bechbaliq Province (Beiting) and Almaliq Province in 1280, it was merged to Chagatai Khanate during 1324 - 1328.

It was part of Bechbaliq Khaganate in 1370, the herd land of the Oirats tribe in the 5th century. After Batur's succession to Khong Tayiji (the chieftain) in 1636, he quickly unified the Oirats tribes in the North Xinjiang, with Hoboksar as the base camp. The Khong Tayiji of Batur built a castle five kilometers away southeast of the present county seat of Hoboksar Town between 1639 - 1643.

The place of Hoboksar was under jurisdiction of Counsellor of Tarbaghatay (under leadship of the General of Ili; "Tarbaghatay", the prensent Tacheng Prefecture) in 1758. The Torghut Tribe back far away from the south side of Russian Ezil River (the present Volga River), immigrated to Hoboksar in 1771.

Hoxtolgay Xianzuo (similar to a division under vice county magistrate; in the present Hoxtolgay Town) under jurisdiction of Shawan County, was formed in 1915 and it was transferred to Tacheng Circuit in 1916. Hoxtolgay Xianzuo was changed to Hoxtolgay Division and the Hefeng Division was formed in 1941. Hefeng County was organized in 1944 and its county seat is in the present Hoboksar Town. Hefeng County was renamed to Hoboksar Mongol Autonomous County on September 10, 1954.

Geography
Hoboksar County is located south of the Tarbagatai-Saur mountain range and its northern part, where most of the county's population lives, receives some water from streams (such as the Baiyang River) flowing from the snow-capped mountains. The southeastern part of the county is in Gurbantünggüt Desert.

Historically, the large Alan Nur and Manas Lake were located in the desert southwestern part of the county; they received water, at least intermittently, both from the streams flowing across the desert from the north and from the south (via the Manas River). Due to the increasing water diversion for irrigation and other human needs, as well as geological processes, the Alan Nur has fully dried out, and the Manas Lake is in a fairly precarious situation as well.

The Irtysh–Karamay Canal, constructed around the turn of the 21st century, crosses the county's southeastern part; the canal's Fengcheng Reservoir is located on the county's border with Karamay City's Urho District.

A point situated some 30 miles ESE of Hoxtolgay Town is  listed as the farthest point from the sea (at ) by the Guinness Book of World Records. It is  roughly 2646 kilometres away from the Arctic Ocean  and a similar distance from the Bay of Bengal and the Arabian Sea (see Continental Pole of Inaccessibility for other candidates).

The "record-setting" location of the county attracted the attention of advertisers for the Corona beer brand, who staged and documented a trip of a few residents of the village of Bulin (布林), in Hoboksar County's Chagankulei Township to the sea coast in Hainan Island.

Administrative divisions
Town
 Hoboksar Town (قوبۇقسار بازىرى / قوبىقسارى قالاشىعى / ᠬᠣᠪᠣᠭᠰᠠᠶᠢᠷ ᠬᠣᠲᠠ), Hebutuoluogai (قوشتولغاي بازىرى)
	
Township
 Xiazigai Township (شازغەت يېزىسى), Tiebukenwusan Township (تېبكىن ئۇسان يېزىسى), Chagankule Township (چاغانكۆل يېزىسى),  Bayinaopao Township (بايىن ئاۋۋا يېزىسى), Motege Township (مۆتگې يېزىسى) || Zhahete

Others
Yikewutubulage Ranch, Nareheuke Ranch, Bagawutubulage Ranch, Busitunge Ranch, XPCC No. 184, Shajihai Mine

Demographics
The Chinese Mongols that live in Bayingolin and Hoboksar come from varied origins. A majority are Torghuts, who speak the Oirat language. Chahar Mongols who immigrated from Inner Mongolia also live in Hoboksar and Bayingolin, and there are also Uriankhai Mongols, who are considered Mongols in China but Tuvans to some outside observers. A fair number of Daur people and Dongxiang people live in Hoboksar especially and they speak Mongolic languages.

Culture
Hoboksar is traditionally considered the place of origin of the Epic of Jangar. The Jangar Culture and Art Palace (江格尔文化艺术宫) was opened in the county in 2014.

Transportation
China National Highway 217 and the new Kuytun–Beitun Railway both cross Hoboksar county along the same north–south corridor. There is daily passenger service at the Hoxtolgay station.

References

External links
 County government - official site 

Mongol autonomous counties
County-level divisions of Xinjiang
Tacheng Prefecture